The Speech to the Troops at Tilbury was delivered on 9 August Old Style (19 August New Style) 1588 by Queen Elizabeth I of England to the land forces earlier assembled at Tilbury in Essex in preparation for repelling the expected invasion by the Spanish Armada.

Before the speech the Armada had been driven from the Strait of Dover in the Battle of Gravelines eleven days earlier, and had by then rounded Scotland on its way home, but troops were still held at ready in case the Spanish army of Alexander Farnese, Duke of Parma, might yet attempt to invade from Dunkirk; two days later they were discharged. On the day of the speech, the Queen left her bodyguard before Tilbury Fort and went among her subjects with an escort of six men. Lord Ormonde walked ahead with the Sword of State; he was followed by a page leading the Queen's charger and another bearing her silver helmet on a cushion; then came the Queen herself, in white with a silver cuirass and mounted on a grey gelding. She was flanked on horseback by her lieutenant general the Earl of Leicester on the right, and on the left by the Earl of Essex, her Master of the Horse. Sir John Norreys brought up the rear.

First version 
The version that is most widely considered to be authentic was found in a letter from Leonel Sharp to the Duke of Buckingham. Sharp had been attached to the Earl of Leicester at Tilbury during the threatened invasion of the Armada and he later became chaplain to Buckingham. Sharp wrote: "The queen the next morning rode through all the squadrons of her army as armed Pallas attended by noble footmen, Leicester, Essex, and Norris, then lord marshal, and divers other great lords. Where she made an excellent oration to her army, which the next day after her departure, I was commanded to redeliver all the army together, to keep a public fast". He also claimed: "No man hath it but myself, and such as I have given it to". It was published in 1654 in a collection titled Cabala, Mysteries of State. A late sixteenth- or early seventeenth-century copy of this speech (with minor variants to the published version) exists in the Harleian Collection of the British Library.

Authenticity
The speech's veracity was accepted by the historian J. E. Neale in an article, 'The Sayings of Queen Elizabeth': "I see no serious reason for rejecting the speech. ... some of the phrases have every appearance of being the Queen's, and the whole tone of the speech is surely very much in keeping even with the few Elizabethan quotations that I have had room for in this article. ... I have little doubt that Sharp's version is a copy, at two or three removes, of a speech actually written by Elizabeth herself". The speech has been accepted as genuine by the historians Mandell Creighton, Garrett Mattingly, Patrick Collinson ("...there is no reason to doubt its authenticity"), Wallace T. MacCaffrey, Lady Anne Somerset, Antonia Fraser, Alison Weir, Christopher Haigh, Simon Schama, David Starkey and Robert Hutchinson.

Janet M. Green of Kent State University in an article for the Sixteenth Century Journal in 1997 states that "substantial evidence exists for believing the Tilbury oration is genuine, which falls into three categories: First, internal rhetorical characteristics link this oration very strongly to Elizabeth's others. Second, there is considerable contemporary evidence that she delivered a speech at Tilbury whose phrases, often remarked, were like those of the speech we have.... The internal evidence of the Tilbury oration provides the best argument for Elizabeth's authorship".

David Loades has written: "Whether she used these words, we do not know, although they have an authentic, theatrical ring".

However, there are some historians who question its authenticity, such as Miller Christy, in 1919. Also sceptical were Felix Barker and Susan Frye.

Physical appearance at Tilbury
Elizabeth's physical appearance was vital to the historical event and just at least as important as the actual speech. Dozens of descriptions of Elizabeth on that day exist, with slightly differing details. Similarities between descriptions indicate that she at least wore a plumed helmet and a steel cuirass over a white velvet gown. She held a gold and silver truncheon, or baton, in her hand as she rode atop a white steed. As quoted in J. E. Neale's Elizabeth, her demeanour was "full of princely resolution and more than feminine courage" and that "she passed like some Amazonian empress through all her army". That striking image is reminiscent of several literary and mythological figures. One of those is Pallas Athena, the Greek goddess of war, who was often classically portrayed as wearing a helmet and armour. Another figure that Elizabeth represented during this speech was Britomart, originally a Greek nymph and more recently the allegorical heroine in Edmund Spenser's epic The Faerie Queene. The etymology of the name "Britomart" seems to suggest British military power. Spenser deliberately wrote the character to represent Queen Elizabeth I and so in essence, they are the same. Her subjects would have been familiar with both Athena and Britomart, and Elizabeth's adoption of their personas would have been fairly recognisable. Besides representing the figures, by wearing armour, Elizabeth implied that she was ready to fight for and alongside her people. However, as Garrett Mattingly put it:

Speech
After she had made her rounds through the troops, Elizabeth delivered her speech to them. Leonel Sharp's version is accepted as the speech that she gave, and it best captures her rhetorical strategies as opposed to the versions of William Leigh and James Aske. In the past, Elizabeth had defied gender expectations by refusing to marry or produce heirs, instead opting to rule alone, with God and England as her soul mates. Elizabeth practically claims that she is both King and Queen of England in the most famous line of the address, "I have the body of a weak, feeble woman; but I have the heart and stomach of a king, and of a King of England too." At the same time that she claims the power, she acknowledges her physical weakness and condescends to the level of soldiers and subjects to whom she lovingly refers in the speech.
Elizabeth calls upon God in the speech and asserts confidence in her own faith and the salvation of herself and her people, thereby placing Spain and the Pope as the ones in the wrong, calling them "tyrants" and "enemies" of both Elizabeth and England.

If the speech is accepted as the true speech given at Tilbury, it is worth noting that Elizabeth wrote it herself. As a writer, she wrote many of her own speeches as well as poems.

Second version
Another version of the speech was recorded in 1612 by William Leigh. His version reads:

Third version
In Elizabetha Triumphans, published in 1588, James Aske provides a version of the speech, reworked in verse:

Summary

A summary of the speech appears in Lewes Lewkenor's The Estate of English Fugitives  written in 1595, which mentions the Spanish Armada.

Lewkenor says,

In popular culture
Reports of the queen's visit to Tilbury circulated rapidly in the popular media of the day. On 10 August, one day after the speech, a broadside ballad describing the events was registered by the printer John Wolfe in the Stationer's Register of London. The ballad, written by Thomas Deloney, one of the most popular poets of the day, corresponds fairly closely to John Aske's description of the events in Elizabetha Triumphans. A second ballad on the same subject, likewise printed by Wolfe, also survives.

Parts of the speech were quoted in the television series The Virgin Queen (2005) and Elizabeth I (2005), as well as the film Elizabeth: The Golden Age (2007).

References

External links

 Photograph of a page of the Sharp letter held at the British Library
 Transcription of the Sharp letter on a website called tudorhistory.org

1588 in England
Eighty Years' War (1566–1609)
Elizabeth I
Speeches by heads of state
History of Thurrock
Tudor England
Tilbury
1588 works
16th-century speeches